Portishead Lifeboat Station (based in Portishead, Somerset) opened in 1995 as Portishead Lifeboat Trust, an independent lifeboat operating from Sugar Loaf Bay. It was adopted by the Royal National Lifeboat Institution (RNLI) in 2015 when a new lifeboat station was opened adjacent to Portishead Pier.

The station currently (2019) operates a  RNLB My Lady Anne (B-884) with around 40 volunteer crew.

History
A rescue service in the waters off Portishead was provided from 1967 until 1992 by Portishead Yacht Club. The Portishead Lifeboat Trust was established as a charity in 1995 to provide a replacement service. Their first lifeboat was operational from 6 October 1996 using a base at the Yacht Club's premises in Sugar Loaf Bay to the south of the town.

On 28 August 2008 the lifeboat crew were undertaking a training exercise when the lifeboat was damaged by heavy seas. The Portishead Lifeboat Trust borrowed a lifeboat from SARA while repairs were undertaken by Ribcraft. This lifeboat was later replaced with one leased from the RNLI.

In 2011 the Portishead Lifeboat Trust approached the RNLI to discuss them being adopted by that organisation so as to give a more secure long-term future. The RNLI agreed to this but subject to building a new lifeboat station with better facilities. This was agreed in 2013 and the following year construction of the new station was started.  The building was completed early in 2015. The RNLI asked that the local community should raise £232,000 towards the costs but this was significantly exceeded when an anonymous donor came forward with £500,000.

The Portishead Lifeboat Trust was called out more than 300 times to assist nearly 500 people, and saving 14 lives. In 2014 they could call upon 23 crew members and 11 shore crew, all of whom were volunteers.

On 24 April 2015, the RNLI formally adopted The Portishead Lifeboat Trust when Portishead became the RNLI's 238th Lifeboat Station.

Area of operation
It covers an area of the Bristol Channel around the River Avon, including the Avon itself running up into the city of Bristol. In 2019 they have around 40 volunteer crew members.

Barry Dock can provide a larger All Weather Lifeboat when required.

Fleet

See also
 Independent lifeboats in Britain and Ireland

References

External links

 Portishead Lifeboat Station website
 Portishead Lifeboat Station page on the RNLI website

Lifeboat stations in Somerset
Lifeboat Station
1995 establishments in England